McMaster Divinity College, also known as MDC, is a Baptist Christian seminary in Hamilton, Ontario affiliated with McMaster University and the Canadian Baptists of Ontario and Quebec (Canadian Baptist Ministries). The institution's mission is to develop effective evangelical Christian leaders for the church, academy, and society through university-level education, professional training, and ongoing support.

History

McMaster Divinity College traces its origins to the Toronto Baptist College, founded by Sen. William McMaster in 1881. Toronto Baptist's facilities were on Bloor Street in Toronto, now the Royal Conservatory of Music.  In 1887, the college secured a charter for an independent sectarian university sponsored by the Baptist Convention of Ontario and Quebec and incorporating the arts and sciences, pastoral and missionary training, and Woodstock College (a Baptist preparatory school). The Ladies department of Woodstock College was transferred to Toronto and renamed Moulton College in honour of William McMaster's widow Susan Moulton McMaster.  The university was named in honor of Sen. McMaster, who died in 1888. In 1957, McMaster University was reorganized as a secular public institution, while the theological program became McMaster Divinity College, a separately chartered affiliate college of the university.

Partnerships
Since its reincorporation in 1957, McMaster Divinity College has remained a separately chartered, affiliate college of McMaster University. McMaster Divinity College is accredited affiliate with the Evangelical Fellowship of Canada, the Canadian Baptists of Ontario and Quebec (Canadian Baptist Ministries), the Association of Theological Schools in the United States and Canada and the Council for Christian Colleges & Universities. MDC also serves as a resource for many of McMaster University's Christian groups, offering worship and meeting space, as well as hosting outside speakers.

Programs
McMaster Divinity College admits students to the following programs of study: Doctor of Philosophy (Ph.D.) (Christian Theology), Master of Arts (MA) (Christian Studies), Doctor of Practical Theology (DPT), Master of Divinity (M.Div.), Master of Theological Studies (MTS), Graduate Diploma in Ministry, and Graduate Certificate in Christian Studies.

See also

List of evangelical seminaries and theological colleges
Baptists in Canada

References

External links
Official site
ATS profile of McMaster Divinity College

Baptist seminaries and theological colleges in Canada
1838 establishments in Upper Canada
McMaster University